Benzion Miller (8 December 1947) is a cantor, schochet and mohel, much like his father, Aaron Daniel Miller. He was born in a displaced persons camp in Fernwald, Germany.

Miller's singing career began at the age of five. Miller studied music theory and solfège under Cantor Samuel B. Taube of Montreal. He studied voice production at the Champagne School for Music in Montreal and with Dr. Puggell, cantor Avshalom Zfira, and Allan Bowers. As an interpreter of liturgical music, Benzion Miller is equally at home in operatic repertoire and Jewish and Chassidic folk music. He has appeared with the Israeli Philharmonic Orchestra, the Jerusalem Symphony, the Rishon L'Tzion Symphony, the Haifa Symphony and members of the London Symphony. He has also recorded for the Milken Archive, in Barcelona, Spain with the Barcelona National Symphony Orchestra.

Miller was among the first group of cantors to visit and sing in Eastern European countries after World War II. He has appeared before capacity audiences in Romania, Russia, Poland and Hungary, where he sang with the Budapest State Opera Orchestra. Miller has to his credit many recordings of liturgical, Chassidic and Yiddish music.

Miller has held positions in Montreal at Sheves Achim Synagogue on Côte-des-Neiges, then in Toronto at Shaarei Tefillah Synagogue on Bathurst Street, in Canada. Since 1981, he has been cantor of Temple Beth El of Borough Park in Brooklyn, a pulpit served by Mordechai Hershman, Berele Chagy and Moshe Koussevitzky. He continues to serve as cantor of the synagogue, now Congregation Young Israel Beth El after its merger with Young Israel of Boro Park.

Miller made an appearance in A Cantor's Tale, a documentary about Jackie Mendelson. Miller and Mendelson are shown greeting each other and briefly engaging in conversation.

Family
Benzion's father, cantor, schochet and mohel, Reb Aaron Daniel Miller (1911–2000) was born in the Jewish community of Oświęcim (Yiddish: Oshpitsin, German: Auschwitz) in Poland. Aaron, his father and grandfather were cantors at the Bobover courts. Aaron's wife and children were killed in Nazi concentration camps. Aaron met Benzion's mother, who was from the Belz hasidic dynasty, after the war in a displaced persons camp in Munich, Germany.

Benzion's son, cantor Shimmy Miller, is his choral director and they often performs duets with each other.

Miller has 5 children, three daughters and two sons.

Discography
 "Cantor Benzion Miller Sings Cantorial Concert Masterpieces" – The Milken Archive of Jewish Music, Naxos (May 18, 2004; International: January 2005)
 "HASC – Jerusalem The Experience" (2004)
 "High Holidays" (1997)
 "Shabbat"(1995)
 "I Believe"
 "The Soul Is Yours" "The Two In Harmony"''

See also
 Hazzan
 Jewish Culture Festival in Kraków

External links
 
 Benzion Miller's profile on the Milken Archive of Jewish Music"
 Video: Interview with Benzion Miller

 About Aaron Miller
 Aaron Miller's profile on the Milken Archive of Jewish Music

References

1946 births
Living people
Hazzans
American tenors
Bobov (Hasidic dynasty)
American expatriates in Canada
Polish expatriates in Germany
American Orthodox Jews
American people of Polish-Jewish descent
Polish Orthodox Jews
Musicians from Brooklyn